The 1973 New Jersey State Senate Senate elections were held on November 6. The result of the elections were large gains for the Democratic Party, which won control of the Senate. The party picked up twelve seats. This election marked the first time since 1967 that Democrats controlled the State Senate.

The election coincided with Brendan Byrne's landslide re-election over Republican Charles W. Sandman Jr. The election also took place amidst the height of the Watergate scandal, just weeks after the Saturday Night Massacre.

This was also the first New Jersey Senate election held using single-member districts, as the state completed its long transition following the 1964 Reynolds v. Sims decision. , it remains the largest single change in seats since single-member districts were adopted.

Background

Redistricting

Until 1965, the New Jersey State Senate was composed of 21 senators, with each county electing one senator.  After the U.S. Supreme Court, in Reynolds v. Sims (more commonly known as One Man, One Vote), required redistricting by state legislatures for congressional districts to keep represented populations equal, as well as requiring both houses of state legislatures to have districts drawn that contained roughly equal populations, and to perform redistricting when needed.  In 1965, the Senate was increased from 21 members to 29 members, and larger counties were given more than one seat, and some smaller counties shared one or two senators.  The map was changed again in 1967, and again in 1971, as the state adjusted to the one man, one vote ruling.

For the first time, the state was to be divided into 40 legislative districts, with each district electing one State Senator and two members of the General Assembly.  The districts were drawn first to achieve a population balance (districts were drawn to be within +/- 4% of each other), and then to be as geographically compact as possible.

For the most part, incumbent senators were given their own districts in which to run, with one exception. Senators William J. Bate and Joseph Hirkala, both of Passaic County (District 14), were re-districted into the same district, numbered 34. Bate successfully ran for Assembly rather than challenge Hirkala.

Incumbents not running for re-election

Democratic
J. Edward Crabiel, Middlesex (District 18) (ran for Governor)
Norman Tanzman, Middlesex (District 19) 
Ralph DeRose, Essex (District 28) (ran for Governor)
William J. Bate, Passaic (District 30) (ran for Assembly)
William F. Kelly Jr., Hudson (District 32)

Republican
Frank Italiano, Camden (District 5)
John F. Brown, Ocean (District 9)
Peter W. Thomas, Morris (District 24)
Harold C. Hollenbeck, Bergen (District 36)
Alfred D. Schiaffo, Bergen (District 39)

Summary of results by State Senate District

Close races 
Seats where the margin of victory was under 10%:

Gains and Losses
Nine incumbent Republican senators were defeated for re-election:
 District 6: John L. Miller (R-Camden) lost to Democrat Alene Ammond.
 District 10: Richard Stout (R-Monmouth) lost to Democrat Herbert Buehler.
 District 12: Joseph Azzolina (R-Monmouth) lost to Democrat Eugene Bedell, an Assemblyman from Monmouth County.
 District 14: William Schluter (R-Mercer) lost to Democrat Anne Clark Martindell. the Vice Chairwoman of the New Jersey Democratic State Committee.
 District 20: Frank X. McDermott (R-Union) lost to Democrat Alexander J. Menza, an Assemblyman from Union County.
 District 27: Michael Giuliano (R-Essex) lost to Democrat Carmen Orechio, the Mayor of Nutley.
 District 37: Joseph Woodcock (R-Bergen) lost to Democrat Matthew Feldman. a former State Senator and the Bergen County Democratic Chairman.
 District 38: Frederick Wendel (R-Bergen) lost to Democrat John Skevin, a former Assemblyman from Bergen County.

One incumbent Democratic Senator was defeated for re-election:
 District 35: Joseph Lazzara (D-Passaic) lost to Republican Frank Davenport, the Passaic County Sheriff.

Two incumbent Republican senators were elected to Congress in 1972 and resigned their State Senate seats in January 1973 to take their seats in the U.S. House of Representatives.  Both seats were won by Democrats:
 District 21: Matthew John Rinaldo (R-Union), succeeded by Democrat Thomas Dunn, the Mayor of Elizabeth.
 District 23: Joseph Maraziti (R-Morris), succeeded by Democrat Stephen Wiley, a Morristown attorney.

One incumbent Republican Senator was defeated for renomination in the June primary and Republicans held that seat:
 District 22: Jerome Epstein (R-Union), succeeded by Republican Peter J. McDonough, an Assemblyman from Union County.  McDonough won 60%-40% over the incumbent, who was facing an indictment.

Open seats
Five incumbent Republican senators did not seek re-election in 1973, and Democrats won four of those seats:
 District 5: Frank Italiano (R-Camden), succeeded by Democrat John Horn, the Assembly Minority Leader, from Camden County.
 District 9: John F. Brown (R-Ocean), succeeded by Democrat John F. Russo, a former Ocean County Prosecutor.
 District 24: Peter W. Thomas (R-Morris), succeeded by Republican James P. Vreeland, an Assemblyman from Morris County.
 District 36: Harold Hollenbeck (R-Bergen), succeeded by Democrat Anthony Scardino, the Mayor of Lyndhurst.
 District 39: Alfred Schiaffo (R-Bergen), succeeded by Raymond Garramone, the Mayor of Haworth.

Five incumbent Democratic senators did not seek re-election in 1973.  Democrats won four of those seats, and the fifth was one by an Independent:
 District 18: J. Edward Crabiel (D-Middlesex), who briefly sought the 1973 Democratic nomination for Governor, succeeded by Democrat Bernard Dwyer, the Mayor of Edison.
 District 19: Norman Tanzman (D-Middlesex), succeeded by Democrat John Fay, an Assemblyman from Middlesex County.
 District 28: Ralph DeRose (D-Essex), who lost to Brendan Byrne in the Democratic gubernatorial primary, succeeded by Democrat Martin L. Greenberg, who was Byrne's law partner.
 District 30: William Bate (D-Passaic), succeeded by Independent Anthony Imperiale, an Assemblyman from Essex County.  (Bate was redistricted into District 34, where Democrat Joseph Hirkala lived; instead of challenging Hirkala in the primary, he instead ran successfully for the State Assembly.)
 District 32: William F. Kelly, Jr. (D-Hudson), succeeded by Democrat Joseph W. Tumulty.

Incumbents re-elected
Ten incumbent Democratic senators were re-elected in 1973:
 District 2: Joseph McGahn (D-Atlantic)
 District 4: Joseph Maressa (D-Camden)
 District 7: Edward J. Hughes (D-Burlington)
 District 13: Joseph P. Merlino (D-Mercer)
 District 17: John A. Lynch, Sr. (D-Middlesex)
 District 26: Frank J. Dodd (D-Essex)
 District 29: Wynona Lipman (D-Essex)
 District 31: James P. Dugan (D-Hudson)
 District 33: William Musto (D-Hudson)
 District 34: Joseph Hirkala (D-Passaic)

Seven incumbent Republican senators were re-elected in 1973:
 District 1: James Cafiero (R-Cape May)
 District 8: Barry T. Parker (R-Burlington)
 District 11: Alfred Beadleston (R-Monmouth)
 District 15: Wayne Dumont, Jr. (R-Warren)
 District 16: Raymond Bateman (R-Somerset)
 District 25: James H. Wallwork (R-Essex)
 District 40: Garrett Hagedorn (R-Bergen)

District 1

Republican primary

Results

Democratic primary

Results

General election

Results

District 2
This district consisted of most of Atlantic County, as well as Little Egg Harbor Township, Tuckerton, and rural parts of Burlington County within the Pine Barrens.

Republican primary

Candidates
Irving A. Lilienfeld, Atlantic County Freeholder
F. Frederick Perone

Results

Democratic primary

Candidates
Michael J. Matthews, Atlantic County Freeholder
Joseph McGahn, incumbent Senator

Results

General election

Candidates
Irving A. Lilienfeld, Atlantic County Freeholder (Republican)
Joseph McGahn, incumbent Senator (Democratic)

Campaign
Both candidates supported a statewide referendum on legalized gambling. Lilienfeld and his running mates supported a statewide coordinated mass transit program, while the Democratic ticket supported a county-wide transportation program. The Republicans also emphasized crackdowns on welfare fraud and stricter drug control, while the Democrats campaigned to attract more light industry to the region.

Results

District 3

Republican primary

Candidates
Robert E. Boakes
Walter Fish, Gloucester County Sheriff (write-in)
James M. Turner, incumbent Senator (until June 28)

Campaign
Turner was removed from his seat on June 28 after his conviction for conspiracy to place 6,500 amphetamine tablets in the home of Kenneth A. Gewertz, the Democratic Assemblyman from the district. He was sentenced to five years in prison.

The conviction barred Turner from holding state office. Nevertheless, Turner remained in the race, saying "I intend to win, and I expect the Senate to seat me."

Because it was too late to remove Turner from the ballot, an appeal was made to remove him, which a judge denied. The Republican Party attempted to run a write-in campaign for Gloucester Sheriff Walter Fish instead.

Results

Democratic primary

Candidates
Raymond Zane, Gloucester County Freeholder (Democratic)

Results

General election

Results

District 4

Republican primary

Results

Democratic primary

Candidates
Joseph A. Maressa
Robert W. Yost

Results

General election

Results

District 5

Republican primary

Results

Democratic primary

Candidates
John J. Horn, Assembly Minority Leader

Results

General election

District 6

Republican primary

Results

Democratic primary

Results

General election

District 7

Republican primary

Results

Democratic primary

Results

General election

District 8
This district consisted of rural and suburban parts of Burlington County and eastern Mercer County, as well as Allentown, Roosevelt, and Upper Freehold Township in Monmouth County and Lakehurst and Manchester Township in Ocean County.

Republican primary

Results

Democratic primary

Results

General election

Candidates
Salvatore DiDonato, Mercer County Community College administrator (Democratic)
Barry T. Parker, incumbent Senator (Republican)

Campaign
DiDonato attacked Parker for his alleged support for special interest groups, particularly those involving workers' compensation issues. Parker, a member of the Senate Judiciary Committee, pledged "complete honesty and integrity in government."

Results

District 9
This district consisted of most of Ocean County, except for Little Egg Harbor, Tuckerton, and Manchester. It also took in Woodland Township in Burlington County and Millstone in Monmouth County. The largest towns in the district were Toms River and Lakewood.

Republican primary

Results

Democratic primary

Candidates
Gaetano J. Alaimo
Wesley K. Bell
Mark E. Egan
John F. Russo, former Ocean County Prosecutor

Results

General election

Candidates
Benjamin H. Mabie, Assemblyman from Pine Beach (Republican)
John F. Russo, former Ocean County Prosecutor (Democratic)

Campaign
Tax reform was the overriding issue in the race. Mabie and his Republican running mates opposed an income tax and advocated using state lottery revenue and the $200 million budget surplus to fund public education. This plan was predicated on passage of federal legislation absorbing state welfare costs.

Results

District 10
This Monmouth County district consisted of Wall Township and a series of shore towns: Monmouth Beach, Long Branch, Deal, Allenhurst, Loch Arbour, Interlaken, Ocean Township, Asbury Park, Neptune, Neptune City, Bradley Beach, Avon, Belmar, South Belmar, Spring Lake, Spring Lake Heights, Sea Girt, Manasquan, Brielle, Point Pleasant, and Point Pleasant Beach.

Republican primary

Results

Democratic primary

General election

Candidates
Herbert J. Buehler, Ocean Township teacher (Democratic)
Richard R. Stout, incumbent Senator (Republican)

Campaign
Buehler focused his attacks on Stout's transportation record, charging that he failed to attract state and federal grants to solve the region's railroad issues. Stout maintained that he and other Republicans had attempted to do so, but were obstructed by the bankruptcy of the Penn Central Railroad. Stout also backed Republican gubernatorial nominee Charles W. Sandman's proposal for a mass transit agency, while Buehler backed his party's candidate, Brendan Byrne, by proposing that the Port Authority should assume responsibility for electrifying the New York and Long Branch Railroad.

The district was considered a Republican stronghold; Stout had been in office for 22 years. However, Buehler hoped to benefit from the popularity of Democratic gubernatorial candidate Brendan Byrne in the district.

Results

District 11
This district was located entirely within Monmouth County. It included the municipalities of Atlantic Higlands, Colts Neck, Eatontown, Englishtown, Fair Haven, Farmingdale, Freehold, Freehold Township, Hazlet Township, Highlands, Holmdel, Howell Township, Little Silver, Manalapan Township, Marlboro Township, New Shrewsbury, Oceanport, Rumson, Sea Bright, Shrewsbury, Shrewsbury Township, and West Long Branch.

Republican primary

Results

Democratic primary

General election

Candidates
Alfred N. Beadleston, incumbent Senator and President of the New Jersey Senate (Republican)
H. Joseph Dietz, Colts Neck businessman (Democratic)

Campaign
Beadleston took a low-profile approach to his campaign. Dietz, who ran an individual campaign separate from his Assembly running mates, challened Beadleston to debates but was ignored or rejected. At one point, Dietz challenged Beadleston to a debate while Beadleston was serving as acting Governor.

Both candidates opposed a state income tax and supported cuts to welfare spending. They differed on how to reduce welfare spending, with Beadleston supporting a state takeover and Dietz supporting a federal takeover.

Results

District 12
This district was composed of the northern Monmouth County and southeastern Middlesex County. It included the Monmouth municipalities of Red Bank, Keansburg, Union Beach, Keyport, Matawan, Middletown Township and the Middlesex municipalities of Jamesburg, Madison Township (renamed Old Bridge in 1975), and Monroe Township.

Madison, Monroe, and Middletown were the largest and most politically significant municipalities.

Republican primary

Results

Democratic primary

Candidates
Eugene J. Bedell, incumbent Assemblyman

Results

General election

Candidates
Joseph Azzolina, incumbent Senator (Republican)
Eugene Bedell, Assemblyman and labor union manager (Democratic)
Peter P. Garibaldi, Assemblyman and public accountant (Independent)

Peter P. Garibaldi, an incumbent Republican Assemblyman, entered the race after the Middlesex Republican Party denied him their nomination.

Campaign
This race featured three men who would serve in the Senate at some point: the incumbent Joseph Azzolina, the victor Eugene Bedell, and future Senator Peter P. Garibaldi. Though Garibaldi was a Republican, his campaign was expected to draw liberal Democratic voters away from Bedell.

One of the key issues in the campaign was the potential construction of a deepwater port. Azzolina was opposed to a port in the district; Bedell initially favored it before softening his stance. Bedell's Assembly running mates opposed a port until it could be deemed safe. Garibaldi received the highest score from the New Jersey Environmental Voters Alliance.

Results

District 13

Republican primary

Results

Democratic primary

Candidates
Joseph P. Merlino, incumbent Senator (District 6B)

Results

General election

District 14

Republican primary

Candidates
William Schluter, incumbent Senator (District 6A)

Results

Democratic primary

Candidates
Anne Clark Martindell, vice chair of the New Jersey Democratic State Committee

Results

General election

District 15

Republican primary

Candidates
Wayne Dumont Jr., incumbent Senator since 1968 (District 15)

Results

Democratic primary

Candidates
Martin F. Murphy

Results

General election

District 16

Republican primary

Candidates
Raymond Bateman, incumbent Senator since 1958 (District 8)

Results

Democratic primary

Candidates
Herbert Koransky

Results

General election

District 17

Republican primary

Candidates
Robert K. Harlig Jr.

Results

Democratic primary

Candidates
John Lynch, incumbent Senator since 1956 (District 7)

Results

General election

District 18

Republican primary

Candidates
Fuller H. Brooks

Results

Democratic primary

Candidates
Bernard J. Dwyer, Mayor of Edison

Results

General election

District 19

Republican primary

Candidates
Matthew E. Hawke

Results

Democratic primary

Candidates
John J. Fay Jr., incumbent Assemblyman

Results

General election

District 20

Republican primary

Candidates
Francis X. McDermott, incumbent Senator (District 9)

Results

Democratic primary

Candidates
Alexander J. Menza, incumbent Assemblyman

Results

General election

District 21

Republican primary

Candidates
William G. Palermo Jr.

Results

Democratic primary

Candidates
Thomas G. Dunn, incumbent Senator

Results

General election

District 22

Republican primary

Candidates
Jerome Epstein, incumbent Senator (District 9)
Peter McDonough, incumbent Assemblyman

Results

Democratic primary

Candidates
William Wright Jr.

Results

General election

District 23

Republican primary

Candidates
Josephine Margetts, incumbent Assemblywoman
Joseph F. Warganz

Results

Democratic primary

Candidates
Stephen B. Wiley, Morris Township attorney

Results

General election

District 24

Republican primary

Candidates
Peter W. Thomas, incumbent Senator (District 10)

Results

Democratic primary

Candidates
John C. Keefe

Results

General election

District 25

Republican primary

Candidates
James Wallwork, incumbent Senator (District 11)

Results

Democratic primary

Candidates
Donald S. Coburn
Joel Wasserman

Results

General election

District 26

Republican primary

Candidates
Salvatore Beninanti

Results

Democratic primary

Candidates
Frank J. Dodd, incumbent Senator (District 11)
Joseph A. Lazaro

Results

General election

District 27

Republican primary

Candidates
Michael A. Giuliano, incumbent Senator (District 11)

Results

Democratic primary

Candidates
Carmen Orechio, mayor of Nutley

Results

General election

District 28

Republican primary

Candidates
Joseph Galluzzi

Results

Democratic primary

Candidates
Martin L. Greenberg, attorney, candidate for Senator in 1971, and political director for Governor Brendan Byrne's re-election campaign

Declined
Ralph DeRose, incumbent Senator (District 11) (running for Governor)

Results

General election

District 29

Republican primary

Candidates
Lillie Simpson

Results

Democratic primary

Candidates
Wynona Lipman, incumbent Senator (District 11)

Results

General election

District 30

Republican primary

Candidates
C. Richard Fiore, incumbent Assemblyman from Newark

Results

Democratic primary

Candidates
Gregory J. Castano, Newark Star-Ledger sportswriter
Mary V. Senatore, Belleville Commissioner

Campaign
The campaign pitted the Hudson County Democratic Organization, which supported Castano, against the Essex County Organization, which supported Senatore.

Results

General election

District 31

Republican primary

Candidates
Franco Di Domenica
Henry W. Kolakowski

Results

Democratic primary

Candidates
James P. Dugan, incumbent Senator (District 12)

Results

General election

District 32

Republican primary

Candidates
John P. Errico

Results

Democratic primary

Candidates
Michael J. Bell
Joseph W. Tumulty, Jersey City attorney

Declined
William F. Kelly Jr., incumbent Senator (District 12) since 1958

Results

General election

District 33

Republican primary

Candidates
Thomas McSherry

Results

Democratic primary

Candidates
Harry J. Leber
William V. Musto, incumbent Senator (District 12)

Results

General election

District 34

Republican primary

Candidates
Louise Friedman

Results

Democratic primary

Candidates
Joseph Hirkala, incumbent Senator (District 14)

Declined
William J. Bate, incumbent Senator (District 14) (ran for Assembly)

Results

General election

District 35

Democratic primary

Candidates
Dominic Cuccinello
Michael U. DeVita, former mayor of Paterson (1948–51)
Joseph A. Lazzara, incumbent Senator (District 14)
Roy Leon Ward

Results

Republican primary

Candidates
Frank Davenport, Passaic County Sheriff

Results

General election

District 36

Republican primary

Candidates
Harold A. Pareti

Declined
Harold Hollenbeck

Results

Democratic primary

Candidates
Anthony Scardino, mayor of Lyndhurst

Results

General election

District 37

Republican primary

Candidates
Joseph Woodcock, incumbent Senator (District 13)

Results

Democratic primary

Candidates
Matthew Feldman, Bergen County Democratic chairman and former Senator

Results

General election

District 38

Republican primary

Candidates
Frederick E. Wendel, incumbent Senator (District 13)

Results

Democratic primary

Candidates
John Skevin, former Assemblyman (1966–68)
Joseph Ventricelli

Results

General election

District 39

Republican primary

Candidates
Harry Randall Jr.

Results

Democratic primary

Candidates
Raymond Garramone, mayor of Haworth

Results

General election

District 40

Republican primary

Candidates
Garrett W. Hagedorn, incumbent Senator (District 13)

Results

Democratic primary

Candidates
Paul Z. Lewis

Results

General election

Leadership
Democrats chose Frank J. Dodd as the Senate President and Matthew Feldman as Majority Leader; Republicans named the outgoing Senate President, Alfred Beadleston as Minority Leader.

Notes

References

1973 New Jersey elections
New Jersey
1973